The Maynard tape primer was a system designed by Edward Maynard to allow for more rapid reloading of muskets.

Invention
Muskets in the early 19th century were flintlocks, which had a high rate of misfire and performed poorly in damp and humid weather. In 1807 the first percussion ignition system was patented by Alexander Forsyth based on research on fulminates conducted by Edward Charles Howard, but practical percussion lock systems did not become available until the 1820s, after Alexander John Forsyth's patent had expired.

Percussion cap systems relied on small copper caps that were filled with mercury fulminate. While they greatly improved the reliability of muskets and their performance in damp weather, the slow rate of fire of muskets was still an issue. Dr. Edward Maynard, a dentist with an interest in firearms, embedded tiny pellets of priming material in thin strips of paper, then glued a second strip of paper on top of the first, creating a "tape" of primer. The tape could be manufactured quickly and cheaply, since paper was much less expensive than copper. Maynard also developed an automatic feeding system that would advance the tape when the musket's hammer was cocked. The hammer not only detonated the primer, but would also automatically cut the paper, thus removing the spent portion of the primer tape.

Initial reception

Maynard's new system still required the musket's powder and Minié ball to be loaded conventionally into the barrel, but the tape system meant that the percussion cap no longer needed to be manually loaded onto the percussion lock's nipple. This saved the soldier a step during the reloading process, which increased the soldier's overall rate of fire.

The Ordnance Board was initially hesitant about the design, but the secretary of war, future Confederate President Jefferson Davis, was so enthusiastic about the design that it was installed on the Springfield Model 1855 rifle-musket.

Performance in the field
The Maynard tape worked well under controlled conditions, but proved to be unreliable in the field. The mechanism proved to be delicate and fouled easily with mud and debris. The tape had been advertised as waterproof, but moisture tended to be its worst problem. The paper strips were susceptible to adverse weather and even humidity. For later muskets like the Springfield Model 1861, the Ordnance Department abandoned the Maynard system and went back to the earlier percussion lock. The M1855 was designed to use either the Maynard system or standard percussion caps, and so remained functional even with the problems of the Maynard system.

Variations of the Maynard tape system are still used today in modern toy guns.

References
 Pauly, Roger (2004). Firearms: The Life Story of a Technology. Greenwood Publishing Group. 
 Coggins, Jack (2004). Arms and Equipment of the Civil War. Courier Dover Publications. 

Early modern firearms
Ammunition
American inventions
19th-century inventions
Firearm terminology